Tummas Símunarson was the Lawman (prime minister) of the Faroe Islands from 1601, until his death in 1608.

References

Løgtingið 150 - Hátíðarrit. Tórshavn 2002, Bind 2, S. 366. (Avsnitt Føroya løgmenn fram til 1816) (PDF-Download)

1608 deaths
Lawmen of the Faroe Islands
Year of birth unknown
17th-century Norwegian people